Miklós Bély (9 August 1913 – 27 September 1970), was a Hungarian chess International Master (1956), Chess Olympiad team bronze winner (1956).

Biography
Miklós Bély was a medical doctor. In the 1950s he was one of Hungary's leading chess players. Miklós Bély participated in Hungarian Chess Championship where best result reached in 1954, when he shared 3rd-4th place, and in 1955, when he ranked 5th. Miklós Bély was laureate of many international chess tournaments, including shared 1st-2nd place in Smederevska Palanka (1956), and won 2nd place in Reggio nell'Emilia (1959/60).

Miklós Bély played for Hungary in the Chess Olympiads:
 In 1956, at reserve board in the 12th Chess Olympiad in Moscow (+4, =5, -2) and won team bronze medal.

In 1956, he was awarded the FIDE International Master (IM) title.

Miklós Bély passed away after a stress induced heart attack during a chess game.

References

External links

Miklós Bély chess games at 365chess.com

1913 births
1970 deaths
Sportspeople from Budapest
Hungarian chess players
Chess International Masters
Chess Olympiad competitors
20th-century chess players